The women's lightweight (56 kg/123.2 lbs) Full-Contact category at the W.A.K.O. European Championships 2004 in Budva was the third lightest of the female Full-Contact tournaments and involved seven fighters.  Each of the matches was three rounds of two minutes each and were fought under Full-Contact kickboxing rules.

As there were too few participants for tournament designed for eight, one of the women had a bye through to the semi finals.  The gold medallist was Sveta Kulakova from Russia who defeated Hungarian Zsuzsanna Szuknai in the final by unanimous decision.  Defeated semi finalists Finland's Jutta Nordberg and Germany's Natalie Kalinowski received bronze medals.

Results

Key

See also
List of WAKO Amateur European Championships
List of WAKO Amateur World Championships
List of female kickboxers

References

External links
 WAKO World Association of Kickboxing Organizations Official Site

W.A.K.O. European Championships 2004 (Budva)